Al-Fouta Park, formerly al-Ghouta Park, is a municipal park in the al-Fouta neighborhood of Riyadh, Saudi Arabia, located south of the Red Palace. Established in 1957 on the grounds of palm groves, it is considered to be the first public park of Riyadh. As per widely held beliefs, the park's name is an aberration of Ghouta, a countryside suburban area of Damascus, Syria that was suggested by a Syrian engineer employed in the Riyadh Municipality who, owing to its verdure, attributed it to the place . However, its historical accuracy has been often contested. The park started to receive large number of visitors after its complete rehabilitation and reopening by Prince Dr. Abdulaziz Ayyaf al-Muqrin in 2008. It is part of the King Abdulaziz Historical Center.

References 

Riyadh
Parks in Saudi Arabia
1957 establishments in Saudi Arabia